Elliott is a town in Northern Territory of Australia. It is almost halfway between Darwin and Alice Springs on the Stuart Highway. The town is in the Yapurkulangu ward of the Barkly Region. At the 2016 census, Elliott had a population of 339.

History
The area is the home of the Jingili people and the traditional name of the town is Kulumindini. The town began at the site of Number 8 Bore on Newcastle Waters Station as an Australian Army camp during World War II. It is named after Army Captain R.D (Snow) Elliott MBE.

Geography
It lies close to the seasonal Lake Woods and is located within the federal division of Lingiari, the territory electoral division of Barkly and the local government area of the Barkly Region.

Climate 
Ellio experiences a hot semi-arid climate (Köppen climate classification BSh), being a little too dry to be classified as a tropical savanna climate (Aw), with a wet season from late November to March and a dry season from April to late October.

Community Services 
Barkly Regional Council, with the support of Library & Archives NT, delivers public library and information services in Elliot through the Tennant Creek Public Library. The Library has a range of services available to all residents & visitors to the region. Visitors to the region can also access temporary membership for the duration of their stay. The Library has a range of services available including computer access, Wi-Fi, printing and scanning. For resources not available through Tennant Creek Public Library's print or eResource collection the Inter-Library Loans service can attempt to source for you from another library in the Northern Territory.

Library members have access to additional benefits including borrowing of a large collection of resources (Fiction, Non-Fiction, Large Print and Picture books ; Comics & Graphic Novels ; Movies and TV Series ; Music CDs ; Audiobooks ; Magazines) from nearly and public library in NT, free Internet, online resources like BorrowBox and Busythings.

Industry 
Elliot is the proposed site of a very large solar panel installation that is part of the Sun Cable project.

Notable people
The members of the Kulumindini Band.
Jake Neade, an AFL footballer.

References

Towns in the Northern Territory
Barkly Region